Rolf Deyhle (1938–2014) was a German property developer, art collector and film producer.
In September 1992 Deyhle was listed by Fortune as having a combined wealth of 1.1 billion.

Deyhle designed the FIFA logo in 1977 and subsequently obtained the marketing rights to all FIFA-related signs, symbols and designs until the 1994 World Cup in the United States, against the wishes of the then FIFA President João Havelange.

Deyhle owned Stella AG, the German theatre production company that also owned theatres in Hamburg. In 1997, it employed 4,500 people, claimed to be the market leader in the German musical sector, and was due to float 49% on the German stock market. Stella AG eventually became insolvent and was taken over in 2001 by Stage Entertainment.

Deyhle died on May 2, 2014 and was survived by a wife and six children.

References

1938 births
2014 deaths
German billionaires
German film producers
Film people from Stuttgart
Businesspeople from Stuttgart